Raju Rocket is a 2012 Pakistani comedy drama serial aired on the Hum TV. Serial was first aired on 27 August 2012; and is  directed by Saima Waseem and written by Imran Ali Safir, starring Danish Taimoor, Sumbul Iqbal, Madiha Rizvi, Rubina Ashraf, Nadia Afghan and Qazi Wajid.

Cast 
 Danish Taimoor as Raju Rocket
 Sumbul Iqbal as Hina
 Madiha Rizvi as Tania Madam
 Rubina Ashraf as Tania's Mother
 Nadia Afghan as Sameen
 Qazi Wajid as Tania's Grandfather
 Rubina Arif as Sameen's Mother
 Sabahat Ali Bukhari as Nadeem's Mother
 Zaheen Tahira
 Afshan Qureshi
 Rashid Farooqui

References

External links 
 

2012 Pakistani television series debuts
Hum TV original programming
Pakistani drama television series
Pakistani comedy television series
Urdu-language television shows